Arthur Herzog III (April 6, 1927 – May 26, 2010) was an American novelist, non-fiction writer, and journalist, well known for his works of science fiction and true crime books.  He was the son of songwriter Arthur Herzog, Jr. He was married to Leslie Mandel and they did not have any children.

His novels The Swarm and Orca have been made into films.

Herzog was also the author of non-fiction books: The Church Trap is a critique of Protestant, Catholic, and Jewish church organization and institutions particularly in the US;  17 Days: The Katie Beers Story is about the kidnapping and child sexual abuse of Katie Beers.

Bibliography
The Church Trap [non-fiction]. New York, Macmillan, 1968/2003.
The Swarm. Simon & Schuster, 1974.
Earthsound. Simon & Schuster, 1975.
Orca. Pocket Publishers, 1977.
Heat.  Simon & Schuster, 1977.
IQ 83. Simon & Schuster, 1978.
Make Us Happy.  Crowell, 1978. 
Glad to be Here.  Crowell, 1979. 
Aries Rising: A Novel. Richard Marek Publishers, 1980.
The Craving.  Dell Publishing, 1982.
Vesco.  Doubleday, 1987.
The Woodchipper Murder. Henry Holt & Company, 1989.
17 Days: The Katie Beers Story, 2003
The B.S. Factor. iUniverse, 2003
L*S*I*T*T, also called Takeover. (First Published 1983, then 2003) 
A Murder In Our Town (Non Fiction). IUniverse, 2004.
Icetopia. IUniverse, 2004.
Beyond Sci-Fi (Short stories). IUniverse, 2007. 
The Third State. IUniverse, 2005.
The War Peace Establishment (Non Fiction). (First Published 1969, then 2003)
McCarthy For President (Non Fiction). (First Published 1965, then 2003)
How To Write Almost Anything Faster And Better (2006)
Body Parts (Short Stories). IUniverse, 2005.
Polar Swap. IUniverse, 2008.
Imortalon. IUniverse, 2004.
The Town That Moved To Mexico. IUniverse, 2004.
The Village Buyers. IUniverse, 2003.
The Edge of Reality. CreateSpace, 2015.

Filmography
 Orca, 1977. Featuring Richard Harris and Charlotte Rampling. Director: Dino De Laurentiis.
 The Swarm, 1978.  Featuring: Michael Caine, Richard Chamberlain, Olivia de Havilland, Katharine Ross, Richard Widmark.  Director: Irwin Allen.
 Additionally, his science fiction novel IQ 83 is being made into a movie by DreamWorks.

References

Arthur Herzog autobiographical page
The New York Times: Filmography – Arthur Herzog
Arthur Herzog's obituary

External links
 Official Website of Arthur Herzog

Arthur Herzog at The Encyclopedia of Science Fiction, 3rd edition (draft)
 New York Times obituary: "Arthur Herzog III, Author of ‘The Swarm,’ Dies at 83"

20th-century American novelists
21st-century American novelists
American male novelists
American science fiction writers
Novelists from New York (state)
1927 births
2010 deaths
20th-century American male writers
21st-century American male writers